Redemption, also known as Resgate, is a 2019 Mozambican crime film directed by Mickey Fonseca. It is the first Mozambican-made film to be featured on Netflix and at the time of its release on the streamer in July 2020, was the only film from a Portuguese-speaking African country in its catalogue. The story revolves around a life of crime as the lead character decides to change his life and be a better father after spending four years but ends up returning to a life of crime. It was nominated for nine awards and won two of them at the Africa Movie Academy Awards.

Synopsis 
A man who has just returned from prison finds out that, just before passing away, his mother took on a dangerous debt. Although he wants to turn a new leaf, he is forced to once again go back to a life of crime as he needs money desperately.

References

External links
 

Mozambican drama films
2019 films
2019 crime films